Toiano is a village in Tuscany, central Italy, administratively a frazione of the comune of Palaia, province of Pisa.

Toiano is about 50 km from Pisa and 8 km from Palaia.

References

Bibliography 

Frazioni of the Province of Pisa